Joseph Antoine Khawam (born April 14, 1968 in Aleppo, Syria) is a Melkite Greek Catholic bishop and member of the Basilian Aleppian Order. He was appointed the apostolic exarch of the Melkite Catholic Apostolic Exarchate of Venezuela by Pope Francis on December 20, 2019. He is also Apostolic Administrator of the Melkite Greek Catholic Eparchy of Nuestra Señora del Paraíso in Mexico City.

Biography
Joseph Khawam was born in Aleppo, Syria, on April 14, 1968. In 1987 he joined the Basilian Aleppian Order. He studied philosophy and theology at the Pontifical Atheneum of St. Anselm. He made his solemn vows on August 5, 1995, and was ordained a priest on December 16, 1995.

He has served as rector of the minor seminary of the Aleppian order, as pastor of the Kib-Elias church and rector of the church of Notre-Dame-de-Zahle. Later he was appointed secretary of the eparchial presbyteral council of Zahle and a member of the eparchial committee for vocations. In 2007 he became Superior of the Convent of the Most Holy Saviour in Sarba and, from 2011 to 2019 he was Superior of the Convent of Saint George in Bmakine, Souk El-Gharb. In addition, from 2011 to 2015 he served as assistant general of his Order. 

On Friday, December 20, 2019, he was appointed by Pope Francis to serve as Apostolic Exarch for Greek-Melkite faithful residing in Venezuela, following the retirement of the former exarch Georges Kahhalé Zouhaïraty.  At the same time, he was appointed to serve also as Apostolic Administrator of the Melkite Greek Catholic Eparchy of Nuestra Señora del Paraíso in Mexico City, succeeding the American-born bishop Nicholas Samra.

He was consecrated bishop for the titular see of Apamea of Syria of the Greek-Melkites on March 7, 2020.

References

Episcopal succession

See also

 Catholic Church hierarchy
 Lists of patriarchs, archbishops, and bishops

 

Syrian Melkite Greek Catholics
1968 births
Living people
People from Aleppo
Melkite Greek Catholic bishops
Khawam family